Elizabeta "Liz" Ejupi (born 21 April 1994) is a professional footballer who plays as a forward for English club Sunderland. She has previously played for Charlton Athletic (two spells), Nottingham Forest, Notts County, Aston Villa, London City Lionesses, and Durham.

Born in Kosovo and raised in England, she represented England as a youth and Albania at full international level while still a teenager, with an intended switch to the Kosovo national team in 2021 delayed due to documentation issues.

Club career

London City Lionesses
On 18 August 2019, FA Championship club London City Lionesses published the squad list for the 2019–20 season and Ejupi was included. That same day, she made her debut in a 2–0 away win against London Bees after being named in the starting line-up.

Durham
On 23 July 2021, Ejupi signed a one-season contract with FA Championship club Durham. On 29 August 2021, she made her debut in a 2–1 home win against Watford after being named in the starting line-up.

Sunderland
In January 2023, Ejupi left Durham and joined Sunderland.

International career

England U15 and Albania
In 2009, Ejupi became part of England U15 with which she made her debut in a match against Germany U15. On 5 November 2011, she received her first senior international call-up from Albania for the friendly match against Macedonia, and made her debut in the nation's second ever international match after being named in the starting line-up.

Kosovo
On 11 June 2021, Ejupi received a call-up from Kosovo for a four-day training camp in Hajvalia. She was planned to be called up from Kosovo in September 2021 for the 2023 FIFA Women's World Cup qualification matches against Albania and Norway, but due to problems with documentation, namely the lack of passport, could not be part of the national team. Her debut with Kosovo came on 12 April 2022 in a 2023 FIFA Women's World Cup qualification match against Belgium after coming on as a 46th minute substitute in place of Argnesa Rexhepi.

Personal life
Ejupi at the age of three together with her parents and brother due to the Kosovo War was displaced as a refugee in London.

See also
List of Kosovo women's international footballers
List of Albania women's international footballers

References

External links

1994 births
Living people
Sportspeople from Pristina
Kosovan women's footballers
Kosovo women's international footballers
Kosovan women's expatriate footballers
Kosovan expatriate sportspeople in England
Albanian women's footballers
Albania women's international footballers
Albanian expatriate sportspeople in England
English women's footballers
English people of Kosovan descent
English people of Albanian descent
Women's association football forwards
FA Women's National League players
Women's Super League players
Women's Championship (England) players
Charlton Athletic W.F.C. players
Nottingham Forest Women F.C. players
Notts County L.F.C. players
Aston Villa W.F.C. players
London City Lionesses players
Durham W.F.C. players
Sunderland A.F.C. Ladies players
Dual internationalists (women's football)